Encounters of the Spooky Kind is a 1980 Hong Kong martial arts comedy horror film directed by and starring Sammo Hung, who also wrote the film with Huang Ying, and produced by Hung's production company Bo Ho Film Company. Released as Spooky Encounters in the United States and also known as Close Encounters of the Spooky Kind, the latter title more blatantly mimicking the title of the film Close Encounters of the Third Kind (1977), Encounters of the Spooky Kind was the progenitor of the jiangshi film genre and one of Hong Kong's first action horror comedies.

The film was followed by a stand-alone sequel starring Hung and Lam Ching-ying, Encounters of the Spooky Kind II (also known as Close Encounters of the Spooky Kind 2) in 1990, which has no relation to Encounters of the Spooky Kind.

Plot
The film starts with Bold Cheung having a nightmare about two ghosts, an elder and the young adult, first in a wine jar and then as a human.  Cheung narrowly escapes the two ghosts, but they still pursue him.

Bold Cheung is challenged to spend the night in an abandoned house where he must peel an apple in front of a mirror. If he breaks the skin then something bad will happen. Upholding his mantle as the boldest he accepts. However, that night whilst peeling the apple his friends trick him. Whilst scolding his friend for the prank a real ghost appears and snatches Cheung's friend away. The ghost reaches for Cheung but he cuts its hand off and then quickly shattering the mirror, causing the house to collapse.

The next day Cheung overhears a story about a promiscuous wife from a sweet tofu seller (who admits that something similar happened to him and his wife); he goes to his home to check on his wife and finds two peeping toms outside his door. He scolds them, causing his wife and employer, Master Tam, to hear. Tam escapes but leaves his shoe which Cheung finds and confronts his wife with. His wife pulls a tantrum and makes Cheung feel guilty.

Master Tam is worried Cheung will find out about the affair so he hires a Mao Shan witch, Chin Hoi, to get rid of him. When Chin mentions this to his junior disciple, Priest Tsui, Tsui gets angry stating that it is against the rules of their sect to harm others and is then kicked out by Chin. Cheung is tricked into spending the night in a temple, but he encounters Tsui who tells him that he must sleep on the roof. Cheung does so. A coffin in the temple opens and a jiangshi, a hopping corpse, begins looking for him but he is safe. Chin gives up when he cannot find Cheung (he is controlling the jiangshi) just as Cheung falls down. Chin and the cadaver look for Cheung again. He hides under the coffin but is found, the two fight but by this time the sun was rising so Chin had to move the corpse back into the coffin.

Cheung is tricked into spending another night in the temple. Again he meets Tsui who tells him to collect fifty chicken eggs to throw into the coffin. If he runs out of eggs he must throw dog's blood over the jiangshi. However, the egg seller puts in ten duck eggs. That night Cheung throws in eggs when the coffin begins to open and it works. However, when he throws a duck egg inside, the corpse escapes so Cheung throws the dog's blood onto it which sends Chin flying into Tam's roof severing his control of the jiangshi.

Cheung goes back to town but an Inspector arrests him for murdering his wife even though it is a set-up. Cheung is thrown in prison but escapes by pretending to be sick, he beats up the guards and runs into a forest where he trips over a coffin exposing the corpse within. As Cheung sleeps it comes to life and mimics his actions before an evil force causes it to attack and chase him. Whilst on the run from the corpse Cheung bumps into the Inspector and his men. The jiangshi collapses onto the Inspector giving Cheung time to escape.

Cheung meets up with Tsui who wants to take Cheung as his disciple. As they stop to eat, the Inspector shows up and sends his men after Cheung. Chin is also there and manipulates Cheung's right arm to beat up the people around him and himself however Tsui stops him in a sword fight and Chin escapes. To help Cheung, Tsui uses his magic to manipulate the Inspector's men to fight the Inspector whilst he and Cheung escape.

Tsui initiates Cheung as his disciple at an abandoned Taoist altar drawing talismans onto Cheung’s body. He also gives Cheung his undergarment as protection. Meanwhile Chin sends a vampire after Tsui and Cheung but they defeat it and Tsui uses his magic to force the corpse to tell them where Chin was hiding. They then go to Tam's house to challenge Chin. Both sorcerers use magic to instill spirits into their disciples. Cheung is possessed by the monkey god and Chin’s disciple by the Dragon Taming Arhat. The two possessed apprentices fight with Cheung winning. Chin then forces Master Tam to be possessed with the spirit of Lu Dong Bin but Cheung who is possessed by Hong Hai Er kills him. Then the two sorcerers unleash their magic on each other and Tsui is badly injured with Chin’s sorcery because he gave his magic undergarment to Cheung. Just as it looks like Chin will win Cheung cuts the legs off his altar which causes Chin to lose balance giving Tsui a chance to hit him with magical fire, Chin is set ablaze and falls off his altar to burn to death. However, Tsui is badly hurt by Chin's magic and he too falls off his altar dead. Cheung's wife steps forward in all the madness and tries to convince Cheung that Tam was about to rape her. However, Cheung is not deceived and he punches her over and over again, then throws her.

Cast
 Sammo Hung – Bold Cheung
 Chung Fat – Priest Tsui
 Lam Ching-ying – Inspector
 Jonny Chan – Priest Chin Hoi
 To Siu-ming – Ah To / Ah dooh / Cocky
 Huang Ha – Master Tam (as Wong Ha)
 Dick Wei – Master Lok
 Cheung Ging-boh – Uncle Fok
 Tai Bo – Adviser Lau
 Yuen Miu – Ah To's friend / Prison Guard (2 roles)
 Pang Yun-cheung – Ah To's friend
 Wellson Chin – Police officer
 Ng Min-kan – Police officer
 Leung Suet-mei – Cheung's wife
 Billy Chan – Cheung's friend
 Fung Ging-man – Peeping Tom
 Ho Pak-kwong – Peeping Tom
 Yuen Biao – Vampire
 Lau Chau-sang – Guard
 Wu Ma – Ah Chiu Fa Kau
 Billy Chan – Driver

Box office
Encounters of the Spooky Kind grossed $5,675,626.00 HKD at the Hong Kong box office. It ran in Hong Kong theatres from 24 December 1980 to 8 January 1981.

Home media

VHS

VCD

DVD

Blu-ray

References

External links 
 Encounters of the Spooky Kind at Hong Kong Movie Database
 Encounters of the Spooky Kind at Hong Kong Cinemagic
 
 

1980 films
1980 martial arts films
1980s comedy horror films
1980s martial arts comedy films
1980s Cantonese-language films
Films directed by Sammo Hung
Hong Kong comedy horror films
Hong Kong martial arts comedy films
Jiangshi films
Kung fu films
Martial arts horror films
1980s Hong Kong films